Miriways (TWV 21:24) is an opera in three acts by Telemann given on 26 May 1728 at the Oper am Gänsemarkt in Hamburg. The opera is set in Persia.

Müller took his plot from then current news from the Islamic world – in the form of an inaccurate account of "Miri-Ways", the Pashtun emir Mirwais (1673–1715), published anonymously in German in 1722. The account attributed to Mirwais events, such as the conquering of Isfahan, which were actually the work of his son. Nevertheless Mir Wais became Miriways, titular king of the opera.

Recordings
 With Markus Volpert, Ulrike Hofbauer. L'Orfeo Barockorchester. Michi Gaigg, cpo. 2013
 With André Morsch, Sophie Karthäuser, Akademie für Alte Musik Berlin, conducted by Bernard Labadie. Pentatone Cat:PTC5186842 2020

References

External link 
 

German-language operas
1728 operas
Operas by Georg Philipp Telemann
Opera world premieres at the Hamburg State Opera
Operas
Operas set in Asia